Hardwar Dubey is an Indian politician and a Member of Parliament in the Rajya Sabha from Uttar Pradesh. He is a former member of Uttar Pradesh Legislative Assembly from Agra Cantonment and Minister of State in the Kalyan Singh ministry. He is a member of the Bharatiya Janata Party.

Early life
Dubey is originally from Ballia. He moved to Agra in 1969 and led Akhil Bharatiya Vidyarthi Parishad.

Political career
In the year 1989, he contested and won the Agra Cantonment seat. He again won the 1991 elections and was made the Minister of State for Finance in the Kalyan Singh ministry. Due to controversies, he resigned from the ministerial position within a year.

In 2005, he unsuccessfully contested by-elections from the Kheragarh Assembly seat. Earlier, he also lost in the Agra-Firozabad seat to the Uttar Pradesh Legislative Council election.

In 2011, he took over as BJP’s State Spokesperson and in 2013 as State Vice President.

References

Living people
People from Agra district
Rajya Sabha members from Uttar Pradesh
Bharatiya Janata Party politicians from Uttar Pradesh
Rajya Sabha members from the Bharatiya Janata Party
1949 births